CXF may refer to:

 Apache CXF, an open source software project developing a Web services framework
 CXF, the IATA and FAA LID code for Coldfoot Airport, Alaska, United States